Testudinibacter is a genus of bacteria from the family of Pasteurellaceae with one known species (Testudinibacter aquarius). Testudinibacter aquarius has been isolated from the oral cavity of a turtle (Chelodina longicollis) from Randers in Denmark.

References

Pasteurellales
Bacteria genera
Monotypic bacteria genera